Gunnar "Gurra" Krantz is a Swedish sailor. He skippered the Swedish America's Cup Challenge at the 1992 Louis Vuitton Cup, Swedish Match in the 1997–98 Whitbread Round the World Race and  Team SEB in the 2001–02 Volvo Ocean Race

Achievements

References

External links
 

Swedish male sailors (sport)
Volvo Ocean Race sailors
Volvo Ocean 60 class sailors
1992 America's Cup sailors
Living people
Year of birth missing (living people)